Heirdoms is a Canadian drama film, directed by Emmanuel Tardif and released in 2021. The film stars Martin Dubreuil as Joseph, a man whose wife Roxanne (Charlotte Aubin) has left him, and who is keeping their son Mathieu (Félix Grenier) sequestered at his home to prevent her from being in contact.

The film's cast also includes Léa Roy as a neighbour, and Lucette Chalifoux as a mediator whi is trying to help Joseph and Roxanne resolve their disagreements.

The film premiered at the 2021 Cinéfest Sudbury International Film Festival on September 18, 2021, before going into commercial release on October 8.

References

External links
 

2021 films
2020s French-language films
French-language Canadian films
Films set in Quebec
Films shot in Quebec
Canadian drama films
2021 drama films
2020s Canadian films
Quebec films